Hræthhun (or Rethhun or Hrethhun) Bishop of Leicester, died between 839 and December 840.

Hræthhun was consecrated bishop between 814 and 816. He was styled Abbot of Abingdon in a charter dated 811. However, this charter was found to be a forgery, and so Kelly (2000) excluded him from the list of abbots.

Citations

References

External links
 

9th-century deaths
9th-century English bishops
Bishops of Leicester (ancient)
Year of birth unknown